George Godfrey Wettling (November 28, 1907 – June 6, 1968) was an American jazz drummer.

He was born in Topeka, Kansas, United States, and from  his early teens was living in Chicago, Illinois. He was one of the young Chicagoans who fell in love with jazz as a result of hearing King Oliver's band (with Louis Armstrong on second cornet) at Lincoln Gardens in the early 1920s. Oliver's drummer, Baby Dodds, made a particular and lasting impression on Wettling.

Wettling went on to work with the big bands of Artie Shaw, Bunny Berigan, Red Norvo, Paul Whiteman, and Chico Marx, but he was at his best with bands led by Eddie Condon, Muggsy Spanier, and himself. In these small bands, Wettling demonstrated the arts of dynamics and responding to a particular soloist that he had learned from Baby Dodds.

Wettling was a member of some of Condon's bands, which included Wild Bill Davison, Billy Butterfield, Edmond Hall, Peanuts Hucko, Pee Wee Russell, Cutty Cutshall, Gene Schroeder, Ralph Sutton, and Walter Page. In 1957, he toured England with a Condon band that included Davison, Cutshall, and Schroeder.

Toward the end of his life, Wettling, like his friend clarinetist Pee Wee Russell, took up painting and was influenced by the American cubist Stuart Davis. He has been said to have believed that "jazz drumming and abstract painting seemed different for him only from the point of view of craftsmanship: in both fields he felt rhythm to be decisive".

References

External links
 George Wettling recordings at the Discography of American Historical Recordings.

1907 births
1968 deaths
American jazz drummers
Dixieland jazz musicians
20th-century American drummers
American male drummers
20th-century American male musicians
American male jazz musicians